is a town located in Tamana District, Kumamoto Prefecture, Japan on the island of Kyushu.

As of March 2017, the town has an estimated population of 5,363 and the density of 220 persons per km². The total area is 24.40 km².  The town is served by Konoha railway station on the Kagoshima Main Line.

The Hachiman shrine in the town celebrates an annual spring festival on 19 February and an annual autumn festival on 19 November, which involve sumo wrestling, horse chasing, and kagura ritual dances.

References

External links

Gyokutō official website 

Towns in Kumamoto Prefecture